The Cherokee have participated in over forty treaties in the past three hundred years.

Pre-American Revolution
Treaty between two Cherokee towns with English traders of Carolina, 1684  Established a steady trade in deerskins and Indian slaves. Cherokee leaders who signed were: the Raven (Corani or Kalanu); Sinnawa the Hawk (Tawodi); Nellawgitchi (possibly Mankiller); Gorhaleke; Owasta; – all from Toxawa; and Canacaught (the Great Conqueror); Gohoma; and Caunasaita of Keowa.  In 1690 the first trader established himself among the Cherokee people, and took a native wife. He was Cornelius Doughtery, an Irishman from Virginia. Although contact was limited initially to white traders, important changes began to occur within the Cherokee society as a result. Leadership shifted from priest to warrior, and warriors became hunters for profit. In 1690, the secretary of the colony, James Moore, ventured into the Cherokee country looking for gold. Some Cherokee chiefs visited Charleston in 1693 demanding firearms for their wars against neighboring tribes.
Treaty with South Carolina, 1721  Ceded land between the Santee, Saluda, and Edisto Rivers to the Province of South Carolina.
Treaty of Nikwasi, 1730  Trade agreement with the newly formed royal colony of North Carolina thru Alexander Cuming.
Treaty of Whitehall, 1730  "Articles of Trade and Friendship" between the Cherokee and the English colonies.  Signed between seven Cherokee chiefs (including Attakullakulla) and George II of Great Britain.
Treaty with South Carolina, 24 November 1755  Ceded land between the Wateree and Savannah Rivers to the Province of South Carolina.
Treaty with North Carolina, 1756  Treaty of alliance during the French and Indian War.
Treaty of Long-Island-on-the-Holston, 20 July 1761  Ended the Anglo-Cherokee War with the Colony of Virginia.
Treaty of Charlestown, 18 December 1761  Ended the Anglo-Cherokee War with the Province of South Carolina.
Treaty of Johnson Hall, 12 March 1768  Guaranteed peace between the Cherokee on one side and the Iroquois, the Seven Confederate Nations, and the Caughnawaga on the other.
Treaty of Hard Labour, 14 October 1768  Ceded land in southwestern Virginia to the British Indian Superintendent, John Stuart.
Treaty of Lochaber, 18 October 1770   Ceded land in the later states of Virginia, West Virginia, Tennessee, and Kentucky to the Colony of Virginia.
Treaty with Virginia, early 1772  Ceded land in Virginia and eastern Kentucky to the Colony of Virginia. This actually seems to have been an 'arrangement' made pursuant to the Treaty of Lochaber in 1771, not a bona fide treaty.
Treaty of Sycamore Shoals, 14 March 1775  Ceded claims to the hunting grounds between the Ohio and Cumberland Rivers to the Transylvania Land Company.

Pre-U.S. Constitution
Treaty of Dewitt's Corner, 20 May 1777  Ceded the lands of the Cherokee Lower Towns in the State of South Carolina, except for a narrow strip of what is now Oconee County.
Treaty of Fort Henry, 20 July 1777  Confirmed the cession of the lands to the Watauga Association with the States of Virginia and North Carolina.
Treaty of Long-Island-on-the-Holston, 26 July 1781  Peace treaty between the Overhill, Valley, and Middle Towns, and the Overmountain settlers that confirmed former cessions but gave up no additional land.
Treaty of Augusta, 25 May 1783  The Cherokees ceded their lands between the Savannah and Keowee rivers on the east and the Oconee River on the west in Georgia.
Treaty of Long Swamp Creek, 30 May 1783  Confirmed the northern boundary of the State of Georgia with the Cherokee, between the latter and that state, with the Cherokee ceding large amounts of land between the Savannah and Chattachoochee Rivers to the State of Georgia.
Treaty of Pensacola, 30 May 1784  For alliance and commerce between New Spain and the Cherokee and Muscogee.
Treaty of Dumplin Creek, 10 June 1785  Ceded the "territory south of the French Broad and Holston Rivers and west of the Big Pigeon River" and east of the ridge dividing Little River from the Tennessee River to the State of Franklin.
Treaty of Hopewell, 28 November 1785  Changed the boundaries between the U.S. and Cherokee lands.
Treaty of Coyatee, 3 August 1786  Made with the State of Franklin at gunpoint, this treaty ceded the remaining land north and east of the Little Tennessee River to the ridge dividing it from Little River.

Post-U.S. Constitution
Treaty of Holston, 2 July 1791  Established boundaries between the United States and the Cherokee. Guaranteed by the United States that the lands of the Cherokee have not been ceded to the United States.
Treaty of Philadelphia, 17 February 1792  Supplemented the previous Holston treaty regarding annuities, etc.
Treaty of Walnut Hills, 10 April 1792  Between the Spanish governor in New Orleans and the Cherokee, Muscogee, Choctaw, and Seminole in which the former promised the latter military protection.
Treaty of Pensacola, 26 September 1792  Between the Chickamauga Cherokee (or Lower Cherokee) under John Watts and Arturo O'Neill, governor of Spanish West Florida, for arms and supplies with which to wage war against the United States.
Treaty of Philadelphia, 26 June 1794  Reaffirmed the provisions of the 1785 Treaty of Hopewell and the 1791 Treaty of Holston, particularly those regarding land cession.
Treaty of Tellico Blockhouse, 8 November 1794  Peace treaty with of the United States with the Lower Cherokee ending the Cherokee–American wars.
Treaty of Tellico, 2 October 1798  The boundaries promised in the previous treaty had not been marked and white settlers had come in. Because of this, the Cherokee were told they would need to cede new lands as an "acknowledgment" of the protection of the United States. The U.S. would guarantee the new Cherokee Nation could keep the remainder of its land "forever".
Treaty of Tellico, 24 October 1804  Ceded land.
Treaty of Tellico, 25 October 1805  Ceded land, including that for the Federal Road through the Cherokee Nation.
Treaty of Tellico, 27 October 1805  Ceded land for the state assembly of Tennessee, whose capital was then in East Tennessee, to meet upon.
Treaty of Washington, 7 January 1806  Ceded land.
Treaty of Fort Jackson, 9 August 1814  Ended the Creek War, demanded land from both the Muscogee (Creek) and the Cherokee.
Treaties of Washington, 22 March 1816  Ceded last remaining lands within the territory limits claimed by South Carolina to the state.
Treaty of Chickasaw Council House, 14 September 1816  Ceding land.

Treaty of the Cherokee Agency, 8 July 1817  Acknowledged the division between the Upper Towns, which opposed emigration, and the Lower Towns, which favored emigration, and provided benefits for those who chose to emigrate west and  reservations for those who did not, with the possibility of citizenship of the state they are in.
Treaty of Washington, 27 February 1819  Reaffirmed the Treaty of the Cherokee Agency of 1817, with a few added provisions specifying land reserves for certain Cherokee.
Council Bluffs Treaty, 11 December 1821  Established a new boundary between the Cherokee and Creek nations. The north boundary was later used in the first survey of Carroll County, Georgia.
Treaty of San Antonio de Bexar, with the Spanish Empire, 8 November 1822  Granted land in the province of Tejas in Spanish Mexico upon which the Texas Cherokee band of Richard Fields and The Bowl could live.  Though signed by the Spanish governor of Tejas, the treaty was never ratified, neither by the Viceroyalty of New Spain nor by the succeeding First Mexican Empire or Republic of Mexico.
Treaty of Washington, 6 May 1828  Cherokee Nation West ceded its lands in Arkansas Territory for lands in what becomes Indian Territory.
Treaty of New Echota, 29 December 1835  Surrendered to the United States the lands of the Cherokee Nation East in return for $5,000,000 dollars to be disbursed on a per capita basis, an additional $500,000 dollars is for educational funds, title in perpetuity to an equal amount of land in Indian Territory to that given up, and full compensation for all property left in the East.  The treaty is rejected by the Cherokee National Council but approved by the U.S. Senate.
(Violation of this treaty led to the Cherokee War of 1839, during which most Cherokees were driven north into the Choctaw Nation or who fled south into Mexico. Following this bloody episode, remaining Texas Cherokees under Chicken Trotter joined Mexican forces in a guerrilla war, culminating in the invasion of San Antonio by Mexican General Adrian Woll. Cherokee and allied Indians saw action at the Battle of Salado Creek and against the Dawson regiment. Following this conflict, it was apparent that Mexico's intervention was not going to provide the remaining Texas Cherokees with any stability or lands in the Republic of Texas. This led to a push by newly re-installed Texas President Sam Houston for a peace treaty, in 1843).
Treaty of Bird's Fort with the Republic of Texas, 29 September 1843  Ended hostilities among several Texas tribes, including the Texas Cherokees as negotiated by Chicken Trotter. The Treaty which was ratified by the Congress of the Republic of Texas, recognized the tribal status of the Texas Indians as distinct, including the Cherokees that would later become known as the Texas Cherokees and Associate Bands-Mount Tabor Tabor Indian Commuunity. President of Texas Sam Houston, adopted son of former Principal Chief of the Cherokee Nation West John Jolly, signed for the republic.  This treaty, honored by the State of Texas following annexation, has never been abrogated by the Congress of the United States and in theory is still valid.
Treaty of Tehuacana Creek with the Republic of Texas, 1844  An additional treaty was made in which Chicken Trotter "Devereaux Jarrett Bell" and Wagon Bowles were involved, the latter being the son of Texas Cherokee Chief Bowles also known as Duwa'li or the Bowl. This treaty was approved by the Texas Senate only. Chicken Trotter and his brother John Adair Bell were some of the founders of the Mount Tabor Indian Community.
Treaty of Washington, 6 August 1846  Ended the covert war between the various factions that had been ongoing since 1839 and attempted to unite the Old Settlers, the Treaty Party, and the Latecomers (or National Party).
Treaty of Fort Smith, Arkansas, 13 September 1865  Recognized the claims of the John Ross party as the legitimate Cherokee Nation vis-a-vis those of the Stand Watie party as well as recognized a temporary cease-fire between the Cherokee, Chickasaw, Choctaw, Comanche, Creek, Osage, Quapaw, Seminole, Seneca, Shawnee, Wichita, and Wyandot, with the United States.
Treaty of the Cherokee Nation, 19 July 1866  Annulled "pretended treaty" with Confederate Cherokees; granted amnesty to Cherokees; established a US district court in Indian Territory; prevented the US from trading in the Cherokee Nation unless approved by the Cherokee council or taxing residents of the Cherokee Nation; established that all Cherokee Freedmen and free African-Americans living in the Cherokee Nation "shall have all the rights of native Cherokees"; established right of way for rivers, railroads, and other transportation their Cherokee lands; allowed for the US to settle other Indian people in the Cherokee Nation; prevented members of the US military from selling alcohol to Cherokees for non-medicinal purposes; ceded Cherokee lands in Kansas; and established boundaries and settlements for various individuals.
Treaty of Washington, 29 April 1868  Supplemented the treaty of 1866 and also ceded the Cherokee Outlet in Indian Territory.

References

Cherokee treaties
United States and Native American treaties
Treaties of the Kingdom of Great Britain